The Earthshaker is a blues album by Koko Taylor, released in 1978 by Alligator Records. The album has since been released on CD by Alligator.

Critical reception 

Reviewing in Christgau's Record Guide: Rock Albums of the Seventies (1981), Robert Christgau wrote: "Considering its size, Taylor's voice has never been what you'd call rich—she flubs the pitch quite a bit, and on the slow ones she's often sounded flat emotionally as well. But it retains amazing presence—by now it's deepened and roughened so much that her late work for Chess sounds girlish by comparison. Two or three of the slow ones here really drag, always a crippling flaw in Chicago blues, but the uptempo stuff is exemplary—the songs are fun as songs, and the guitar on her latest remake of 'Wang Dang Doodle' is ace."

Track listing

Personnel 
 Koko Taylor – vocals
 Johnny B. Moore – guitar
 Sammy Lawhorn – guitar
 Pinetop Perkins – keyboards
 Mervyn "Harmonica" Hinds – harmonica
 Abb Locke – saxophone
 Cornelius "Mule" Boyson – bass
 Vince Chappelle – drums

Notes

References 

1978 albums
Koko Taylor albums
Albums produced by Bruce Iglauer
Alligator Records albums